Finspreads is a London-based online financial spread betting firm that offers customers access to various instruments on the world's financial markets through online and mobile trading platforms. Along with IFX Markets, FX Solutions and City Index Limited, it is a trading name of City Index Group.

Background
Finspreads first offered interactive online spread betting in 1999,  before the company was acquired by  the City Index Group.

Trading platform
Finspreads has stated that its goal is to "make spread betting as straightforward as possible for every trader, whatever their level of experience".

The company also offers an eight-week training program, the  Finspreads Trading Academy Course to help customers better understand spread betting.

Spread betting iPhone app - In 2010 Finspreads developed an iPhone app.

References

External links
 Official Finspreads website
 City Index Group website

Financial derivative trading companies
Financial services companies of the United Kingdom
Financial services companies established in 1999
1999 establishments in England
British companies established in 1999
Betting exchanges